Ihar Zyulew (born 5 January 1984) is a Belarusian professional football coach and former player.

Honours
Naftan Novopolotsk
Belarusian Cup winner: 2011–12

External links

1984 births
Living people
Belarusian footballers
Association football forwards
FC Kommunalnik Slonim players
FC Smorgon players
FC Shakhtyor Soligorsk players
FC Naftan Novopolotsk players
FC Isloch Minsk Raion players